Charles Heiné (2 January 1920 – 10 July 1971) was a French footballer who played as a midfielder. He played twice for the France national team during the 1946–47 season under Gaston Barreau and Gabriel Hanot.

Career
Born in Colmar, Heiné began his career at local side SR Colmar, playing in Division 2. He went on play for Racing Club de Strasbourg Alsace and FC Sochaux-Montbéliard. At Strasbourg, he appeared in the 1947 Coupe de France final against Lille OSC which Strasbourg lost 2–0. He made 100 Division 1 appearances scoring 11 goals.

He made two appearances for the France, on 1 June 1947 in a 4–2 win against Belgium and one week later, in a 1–2 win away to Switzerland.

Honours
Strasbourg
 Coupe de France runner-up: 1947

References

External links

 Profile at racingstub.com
 
 
 

1920 births
1971 deaths
French people of German descent
Association football midfielders
French footballers
France international footballers
SR Colmar players
RC Strasbourg Alsace players
FC Sochaux-Montbéliard players
Ligue 1 players